The Count of Monte Cristo (French: Le comte de Monte Cristo) is a 1918 French silent historical film serial based on the novel of the same title by Alexandre Dumas. It was directed by Henri Pouctal and starred Léon Mathot in the title role. It was released in fifteen episodes over a two-month period.

References

Bibliography 
 Goble, Alan. The Complete Index to Literary Sources in Film. Walter de Gruyter, 1999.

External links

 

1918 films
French silent films
1910s French-language films
Count Monte Cristo 1918
Films directed by Henri Pouctal
French black-and-white films
French historical drama films
1910s historical drama films
Pathé films
Silent drama films
1910s French films